Nabiullin is a masculine surname of Tatar origin, its feminine counterpart is Nabiullina. Notable people with the surname include:

Elmir Nabiullin (born 1995), Russian football player
Elvira Nabiullina (born 1963), Russian economist 

Russian-language surnames